
 
 

Eurilla Conservation Park was a protected area located in the Australian state of South Australia in the suburb of Crafers in the Adelaide Hills state government region about  south-east of the state capital of Adelaide and about  north of the town centre in Stirling. It was merged with the adjoining Cleland Conservation Park to become a national park called Cleland National Park on 26  November 2021.

It was proclaimed under the National Parks and Wildlife Act 1972 on 22 September 1977.

In 1980, it was described as follows:The main feature, and reason for dedication of the park, is an undisturbed bog consisting of a dense mat of the rare coral fern (Gleichenia microphylla) and a sizeable colony of mature king fern (Todea barbara), an endangered species in South Australia. These specimens are amongst the finest in the state. An excellent bog habitat surrounded by Eucalyptus obliqua open forest over an open shrub stratum of Exocarpos cupressiformis, Banksia marginata and Pultenaea daphnoides. A dense ground stratum consists of a wide variety of herbs, grasses and forbs. There are many fallen logs in various stages of decay together with a substantial accumulation of forest litter. The park is substantially undisturbed and surrounded by native vegetation on three sides. This area has not been burnt since 1920, and suffers only minor influence from introduced species.

The conservation park was classified as an IUCN Category III protected area. In 1980, it was listed on the now-defunct Register of the National Estate.

See also
Protected areas of South Australia

References

External links
Eurilla Conservation Park on the Protected Planet website
Eurilla Conservation Park on the BirdsSA website

Conservation parks of South Australia
Protected areas established in 1977
1977 establishments in Australia
Adelaide Hills
South Australian places listed on the defunct Register of the National Estate